The tragicus (muscle of tragus or Valsalva muscle) is an intrinsic muscle of the outer ear.

It is a short, flattened vertical band on the lateral surface of the tragus.

While the muscle modifies the auricular shape only minimally in the majority of individuals, this action could increase the opening of the external acoustic meatus in some.

Additional images

See also
 Intrinsic muscles of external ear

References

External links
 AnatomyExpert.com

Ear
Muscles of the head and neck